Kromołów  is a village in the administrative district of Gmina Walce, Krapkowice County, Opole Voivodeship, south-western Poland.

The village has a population of 469.

References

Villages in Krapkowice County